Jay Carl Cashion (June 4, 1891 – November 17, 1935) was a pitcher in Major League Baseball. He played for the Washington Senators from 1911 to 1914. According to Baseball Magazine, Cashion had a fast fastball but was unable to control it.

He is buried in Superior, Wisconsin.

References

External links

1891 births
1935 deaths
Major League Baseball pitchers
Washington Senators (1901–1960) players
Baseball players from North Carolina
Greenville Spinners players
Montreal Royals players
Minneapolis Millers (baseball) players
Davidson Wildcats baseball players
Erskine Flying Fleet baseball players
Burials in Wisconsin